Mell Karen Mina Ayoví (born 23 October 2002) is an Ecuadorian taekwondo practitioner. She won the silver medal in the women's 67kg event at the 2022 South American Games in Asunción, Paraguay. She also won one of the bronze medals in her event at the 2022 Bolivarian Games in Valledupar, Colombia.

In 2019, she competed in the women's featherweight event at the World Taekwondo Championships held in Manchester, United Kingdom. She also competed in the women's 57kg event at the 2019 Pan American Games held in Lima, Peru. In 2020, she competed at the Pan American Olympic Qualification Tournament in Heredia, Costa Rica hoping to qualify for the 2020 Summer Olympics in Tokyo, Japan.

She won one of the bronze medals in the women's 62kg event at the 2022 Pan American Taekwondo Championships held in Punta Cana, Dominican Republic. A few months later, she competed in the women's lightweight event at the 2022 World Taekwondo Championships held in Guadalajara, Mexico.

References

External links
 

Living people
2002 births
Place of birth missing (living people)
Ecuadorian female taekwondo practitioners
Taekwondo practitioners at the 2019 Pan American Games
Pan American Games competitors for Ecuador
Competitors at the 2022 South American Games
South American Games silver medalists for Ecuador
South American Games medalists in taekwondo
21st-century Ecuadorian women